I Love Lee Taly is a 2012 South Korean romantic comedy series about a 14-year-old boy who makes a wish and suddenly grows up into a 25-year-old man. It starred Super Junior's Kim Ki-bum and Park Ye-jin.

Synopsis
14-year-old Geum Eun-dong (Kim Ki-bum) is desperately in love with Lee Tae-ri (Park Ye-jin), a well-bred heiress who is seven years older than he is. Eun-dong's wish is mysteriously granted when he wakes up to find that he's become a handsome 25-year-old man: the perfect contender. As Tae-ri's new assistant Hwang Min-soo, he learns of Tae-ri's heartbreak and discovers that not everything is as it seems in her picture perfect life.

Cast

Main
 Park Ye-jin as Lee Tae-ri  
 Kim Ki-bum as Geum Eun-dong / Hwang Min-soo
 Baek Su-ho as young Eun-dong
 Yang Jin-woo as Choi Seung-jae
 Jubi as Ha Soon-shim

Supporting
 Im Ho as Geum San
 Soy as Na Hong-shil
 Woo Sang-jun 
 Kim Yong-hoon as Manager Moon
 Lee Moon-soo as college graduate Geum 
 Jang Young-nam as Oh Mi-ja
 Jang Seo-won as Hwang Min-gook
 Jeon Yang-ja as Baek Soo-bok
 Choi Deok-moon as Tae-ri's uncle
 Seo Young-joo as Lee Soo-bin

Original soundtrack

 Do It - Sunny Hill 
 사랑...안녕 (Love...Goodbye) - Jun. K (2PM's Junsu) 
 우리 사랑할까요 (Shall We Fall in Love) - Jisook (Rainbow) & Min Hoon-ki 
 이상해요 (It's Strange) - Son Ho-young 
 Rhapsodie Italienne
 Neo Sonic Chiot courant
 Swimming pool
 Valse Italienne Amoureux de toi
 Neo Sonic un chat sur la bicyclette blue
 Neo Sonic Italian piece for orchestra in C minor
 Neo Sonic La Nostalgie
 Neo Sonic Je suis fou de toi
 Love Theme for Italy
 Love Poem
 Neo Sonic beau moment d'amour
 Je t'aime l'Italie!
 Do It Piano version
 사랑...안녕 version orchstrale
 우리 사랑할까요 Bossanova version
 Clair de lune

International broadcast
It aired in Thailand on Channel 7 beginning March 14, 2016, dubbed as pāt̩ih̄āriy̒ rạk tid s̄ pīd. ("ปาฏิหารย์รักติดสปีด", literally: Miracle Love Full Speed).
Perú : Wilax(2020)

References

External links
  
 

2012 South Korean television series debuts
2012 South Korean television series endings
Korean-language television shows
TVN (South Korean TV channel) television dramas
South Korean romantic comedy television series
South Korean fantasy television series